The Mariner's Club was a building in Middle Road, Tsim Sha Tsui, Kowloon, Hong Kong. 

The building was demolished and will be redeveloped into a complex hosting a hotel, a club, a church and gardens.

History
The Mariner's Club at Tsim Sha Tsui was officially opened om May 30, 1967 by the then Governor Sir David Trench.

See also
 Blackhead Point
 Minden Row

References

Further reading

External links

 

Tsim Sha Tsui
Hotels in Hong Kong
Demolished buildings and structures in Hong Kong
Buildings and structures completed in 1967